KPRD is a Christian radio station licensed to Hays, Kansas, broadcasting on 88.9 MHz FM. It is owned by The Praise Network, Inc.

KPRD airs Christian contemporary music, as well as a variety of Christian talk and teaching programs including; Insight for Living with Chuck Swindoll, Revive Our Hearts with Nancy DeMoss Wolgemuth, A New Beginning with Greg Laurie, Moneywise with Howard Dayton, Family Life Today with Dennis Rainey, Adventures in Odyssey, Focus on the Family, and Unshackled!.

Translators
KPRD is also heard on translators throughout Midwest Kansas.

References

External links
KPRD's official website

PRD
Radio stations established in 1994
1994 establishments in Kansas